These are the official results of the Women's Hammer Throw event at the 2003 World Championships in Paris, France. There were a total number of 44 participating athletes, with the final held on Thursday 28 August 2003.

Medalists

Schedule
All times are Central European Time (UTC+1)

Abbreviations
All results shown are in metres

Records

Startlist

Qualification

Group A

Group B

Final

See also
Athletics at the 2003 Pan American Games - Women's hammer throw
2003 Hammer Throw Year Ranking

References
 Results
 hammerthrow.wz

J
Hammer throw at the World Athletics Championships
2003 in women's athletics